The following is a list of Filipino (Pinoy) supervillains, who have either appeared in Filipino comic books, television shows (fantaserye), or movies.

A
Adobe (a.k.a. Ador), supervillain from Captain Barbell (2006 TV series)
Aerobika (a.k.a. Ms. Patty/Ms. Eros), villainess from Captain Barbell (2006 TV series)
Agaddon, a villain from Lastikman (TV series)
Alingasaw (a.k.a. Albert Langitan), a villain from Lastikman (TV series)
Alcera, a villainess from Joaquin Bordado
Amor Labao, a villainess from Lastikman (TV series)
Anak Araw, a villain from Pintados
Andam, a villainess from Panday. She is a bulawan. 
Aswang, supervillain from 1986 movie of Captain Barbell
Andora, one of the enemies from Etheria
Amalanhig, a villain from Da Adventures of Pedro Penduko
Agta, a villain from Da Adventures of Pedro Penduko
Amasonang Itim, a villainess from Zaido
Amasonang Kahel, a villainess from Zaido
Amasonang Lila, a villainess from Zaido
Amasonang Puti, a villainess from Zaido
Amasonang Rosas, a villainess from Zaido
Amazonistas, mortal enemies from Zsazsa Zaturnnah
Abdon Serrano, an enemy from Kamandag
Avria, the archenemy from Etheria

B
Balkan, supervillain from Majika
Babaing Impakta (I), supervillain from Lipad, Darna, Lipad (1973) 
Babaing Impakta (II), supervillain from Darna (2005 TV series)
Babaing Lawin, supervillain from Darna at ang Babaing Lawin (1952) 
Babaing Lawin, supervillain from Darna (2005 TV series)
Babaing Lobo (II), supervillain from Darna (2005 TV series)
Babaing Linta, supervillain from Darna (2005 TV series)
Babaing Tuod (I), supervillain from Darna at ang Babaing Tuod (1965) 
Babaing Tuod (II), supervillain from Darna (2005 TV series)
Baklita, gay supervillain from Bunsong Kerubim
Barracud, an archenemy from Atlantika
Baltimore, a villain from Super Inggo
Bawaw-aw, a monster villain from Zaido
Berberoka, a villainess from Pedro Penduko
Beautiki (a.k.a. Ines Samantela), villainess from Lastikman (TV series)
Biolante, supervillain to Biotroga
Black Darna, a villainess from the Darna (2005 TV series)
Boss Elvis, a villain from Fantastic Man (TV Series)
Braguda, the main villainess from the Darna (2005 TV series)
Bubog (a.k.a. Narciso), supervillain from Captain Barbell (2006 TV series)
Budol, a villain from Fantastic Man (TV Series)
Bola-boba (a.k.a. Coach Vola), a monster villain from Zaido
Bungisngis, a gay villain from Pedro Penduko

C
Candyman, a supervillain from Super Twins
Cyborg 5566, supervillain from Captain Barbell (2006 TV series)
Cefiro, an archnemesis from Joaquin Bordado
China, affiliated with Valentina
Chuva Chew Chewing Gum, a monster from Super Inggo
Circe, a supervillain to Misteryo
Creon, a villain from Ruonin

D
Dagampatay, a villain from the 2003 movie of Captain Barbell
Dalaketnon (a.k.a. Kasimiro and Napoleon), evil engkantos from Pedro Penduko
Darius, a villain from Krystala
Diablolika, a villainess from Super Rangers Kids and Fantastic Man
Digitoy, a villain to Misteryo
Dino, a villain from Zuma the king of snakes
Divas Impaktitas, villains from Darna (2005 TV series)
Disastro, a villain from Misteryo
Divina Demonica, a villainess from Darna (2005 TV series)
Draco, a villain from Ruonin
Dr. Axis, a villain of Batang X
Dr. Blackman, a villain from Alamid
Dr. Zombie, a villain from the Darna (2005 TV series)
Dr. Zyke, a villain from Batang-Z
Dugong, a villainess from Marina (2004 TV series)
Drigo, a villain from Zaido
Dyangga, a villain from Dyesebel (TV series) (ironically, an ally to Dyesebel and Darna in Darna)

E
Ebony, affiliated with Valentina
Ebrio, an enemy from Majika
Eliazar Vergara, a villain from Super Twins
Electa, a villainess from Misteryo
Elektra, supervillain from Si Darna at ang Impakta (1975)
Elemento (a.k.a. Dr. Jared Evilone), an alien villain from Lastikman (TV series)
Ella, The Zombie, supervillain from Darna (2005 TV series)
Emer, a villain from Panday
Ether, a villainess from Etheria
Ex-O/Narda, a cyborg villainess from Captain Barbell (2006 TV series) and Darna (2009 TV Series) 
Exxor, a villain of Biokids

F
Feirrus, a villain from Panday
Flower Pot Girls (a.k.a. Daisy and Rose), a villainesses from Super-B
Flowerettes, villainesses from Krystala
Freezy, a villainess from the 2003 movie of Captain Barbell
Frigidare (a.k.a. Obet), a kid villain from Super Inggo
Frosta (a.k.a. Ayessa White), a villainess from Lastikman (TV series)
Fisherman (a.k.a. Macoy Fernandez), a supervillain from Kung Fu Kids

G
Gagamba, a villainess from the 1986 movie of Captain Barbell
Gamma (a.k.a. Alvaro Lorenzo), an enemy for Zaido
Georgia Ferrer (a.k.a. Athena Francisco), the evil mistress from Ika-6 na Utos
Giga-wiga (a.k.a. Giggle), a monster enemy from Zaido
General Russo, an enemy from Joaquin Bordado
Golda, a villainess from Alamid
Gravigat, a villain from Krystala
Gurrutto, a villain from Marina (2004 TV series)

H
Hagorn, the archenemy from Encantadia
Halimaw sa Banga (a.k.a. Bugan), a villainess from Super Inggo
Harimon, the archenemy of Krystala
Hitano, enemy from Encantadia

I
Ida, a transvestite villain from Zaido
Ida Dida (mini Ida), a villainess from Zaido
Impakta, supervillain from Si Darna at ang Impakta (1963)
Ipisman, a supervillain from Gagamboy
Iron Claw, to Biotrog
Isputnik, from Isputnik vs. Darna (1963)
Ivan, a villain from Extranghero
Ivarna, a villainess from Joaquin Bordado

J
Jaffir, a villain from Panday
Jiamondo, a villain from Panday
Junanaks, a kid villains from Super Inggo
Juno, a villainess from Majika
Jurax, a villain from Misteryo
Juvila, an enemy from Etheria

K
Kabagona, a villainess from Krystala
Kalawit, a villain from Kapitan Kidlat
Kalagua (a.k.a. Dr. Eva Tabinas), a villainess from Pedro Penduko (2007 TV Series)
Kambal Dragon, a villain from Buhawi Jack
Kamaong Asero, a villain from Buhawi Jack
Kamatayan, a villain from Panday
Kapitan Berong, a villain from Super Islaw and the f=Flying Kids (1986 Film)
Kapre, a villain from Pedro Penduko (2006 TV series)
Katana, a villain from Pintados
King Gulag, a villain from Kamandag
Korokoy (a.k.a. Nicasio Allegre), an alien villain from Kokey
Kuuma Le-ar, an archnemesis from Zaido

L
Lady Feirrus, a villainess from Panday
Lagablab, a villain from the 2003 movie of Captain Barbell
Lagablab (a.k.a. Ryan White), a villain from Lastikman (TV series)
Lalaking Ahas", supervillain from Darna (2005 TV series)
Lastika, supervillain from Lastikman (2003 film)
Levi Villian, archnemesis from Captain Barbell (2006 TV series)
Likido, a villain from Krystala
Lizardo, the archenemy of Panday
Lotus, a villainess from Ninja Kids
Lotus Feet, a villain from Super Inggo
Luminax, a villainess from Krystala
Lucan, a supervillain from Super Islaw and the Flying Kids (1986 Film)
Lucas Diablo, a villain from Buhawi Jack
Lucifero, a villain from Ang Pagbabalik ni Pedro Penduko (1994 Film)
Luna,a villainess from Marina (2004 TV series)

M
Maaram, a villain from Lastikman (TV series)
Magnesia, a villainess from Super Twins
Magnetika (a.k.a. Magna), a supervillainess from Captain Barbell (2006 TV series)
Magdalena, a villainess from Mga Mata ni Anghelita
Maluk, a villain from Kampanerang Kuba
Manananggal (a.k.a. Ms. Luna), supervillain from Darna (2005 TV series)
Mary Walter, an old lady from Shake Rattle & Roll (Horror Series)
Mandreko (a.k.a. Val Balbin), a villain from Rubberman
Magnus, a villain from Panday
Manaram, a villainess from Panday
Mambabarang, a villain from the Darna (2005 TV series)
Mercurio, a transvestite villain from Captain Barbell (2006 TV series)
Metallad, a mini villain from Super Twins
Minokawa, a villain from Pedro Penduko, Episode II: The Return of the Comeback
Molecula, a villainess from the Darna (2005 TV series)
Montezatur, supervillain to Billy, The Dragon
Morphino (a.k.a. Mang Ninoy), a supervillain from Lastikman (TV series) (Ironically, another Morphino is an ally to Krystala)
Moshi Moshi Manika (a.k.a. Monica), a villainess from Super Twins
Mothra (a.k.a. Susan Navarro)", a villainess from Lastikman (TV series)
Molecula, villain from Darna (2005 TV series)

N
Nosferamus, a villain from the Darna (2005 TV series)
Nigi-nigi, a monster villain from

O
Otlum, a villain from Kampanerang Kuba
Odessa, an enemy from Etheria

P
Payaso, a villain from Alamid
Pasko-paksiw, a monster villain from Zaido
Peruka, supervillain from Darna (2005 TV series)
Phoenix/Narda, supervillain from Captain Barbell (2006 TV series) and  Darna (2009 TV series) 
Pirena, an enemy from Mulawin (antihero in Encantadia)
Prince of Darkness, a villain from Super Inggo
Putakti (a.k.a. Jared), supervillain from Captain Barbell (2006 TV series)
Prinsipe Inok, an archenemy from Enteng Kabisote film series

Q
Queen Femina Suarestellar Baroux, archnemesis of Zsazsa Zaturnnah
Queen Kuran, a sexy villainess from Kamandag
Queen Elixera, a villainess from Joaquin Bordado

R
Rasmus, archnemesis from Mulawin
Ravenum, main villain from Mulawin
Redentor, a villain from Pandoy: Ang Alalay ng Panday (1993 Film)
Rena Kena, supervillain to Billy, The Dragon
Reno, supervillain to Billy, The Dragon
Rusticus, a villain from Panday
Roko-loko (a.k.a. Rock), a monster villain from Zaido

S
Satano, a villain from Super Rangers Kids
Semona, a villainess from Pedro Penduko (2007 TV Series)
Señor Escobar, a villain of Julio Valiente from San Basilio (1981 Film)
Septo, a villain from Ruonin
Skeleton, a villain from She-Man
Siba-tiba (a.k.a. Tabatino), a monster villain from Zaido
Shadow (a.k.a. Toby Mendoza), an enemy from Zaido
Socur, a villain from Panday
Solcar (a.k.a. Mayor Carlos), archvillain from Mga Mata ni Anghelita
Stryker (a.k.a. Jepoy), supervillain from Lastikman (2003 film)
Sugo Ng Kadiliman", a villain from Krystala
Sulfura, a villainess from the Darna (2005 TV series)
Super Z, a villainess from Krystala
Sigben, villains from Pedro Penduko (TV series)

T
Talim (a.k.a. Lucero)", archnemesis of Kamandag
Taong Aso, father and son supervillains from Lastikman (2003 film)
Taong Bakal, a villain from Kapitan Kidlat
Terracotta, a villain from Krystala
Tetano (a.k.a. Tenorio), supervillain from Captain Barbell (2006 TV series)
Tiktik, a villain from Pedro Penduko (2006 TV series)
Toy Master", a villain from the Darna (2005 TV series)
Tinik-ik, a monster villain from Zaido
Trolka, supervillain from Darna (2005 TV series)
Tutubina, a villainess form Marina (2004 TV series)
Tikbalang, a villain from Pedro Penduko

U

V
Valentina, the archenemy of Darna
Vaporo (a.k.a. Marvin), supervillain from Captain Barbell (2006 TV series)
Varka, supervillain from Darna (2005 TV series)
Vega, a villainess from Ruonin
Venom, a villain from Ruonin
Vexus, a villainess from Joaquin Bordado
Vibora, a villainess from Pandoy
Victoria, a villainess from Marina (2004 TV series)
Viel Villain (The General)", a villain from Captain Barbell (2006 TV series)
Voltar, supervillain to Billy, The Dragon
Vultura, a villainess from Mulawin

W
Warlord, a supervillain from Misteryo
White Lady (a.k.a. Sheila/Ashley), a villainess from Super Inggo

X
X3X, supervillain from Darna and the Giants (1973)

Y

Z
Zoraga, supervillain to Billy, The Dragon
Zygrax, supervillain of Batang X
Zuma, a man with snakes on his back

In television

Color key
  Being a main villain until the end
  Main/Supporting villain but, in the end, reconciled
  Supporting villain until the end
  Extended Villain
  Villain turned Good
  Guest only

See also 

 Philippine comics
 List of Filipino komiks
 List of Filipino komik artists
 List of Filipino superheroes

References

External links
 "Philippine Comics" The most comprehensive library of Filipino comics on the internet.

 
Lists of supervillains
 Supervillains